Erynnis telemachus, the Rocky Mountain duskywing, is a species of spread-wing skipper in the butterfly family Hesperiidae. It is found in North America.

References

Further reading

External links

 

Erynnis
Articles created by Qbugbot
Butterflies described in 1960